Tumalo Mountain is a shield volcano in the Cascade Range of central Oregon, located just northeast of Mount Bachelor across the Cascade Lakes Scenic Byway.

Climb, the views

Ice age glaciers carved a large cirque into the northeast flank of the mountain, producing a bowl which is popular with local backcountry skiers. A United States Forest Service fire lookout tower was built on the summit in the 1930s, but abandoned in the 1970s and subsequently removed. 

A trail to the summit ascends the southwest flank of the volcano.

One can see Broken Top, Mt. Bachelor, and the Three Sisters Complex.

See also

 Tumalo Volcanic Center

References

External links

 
 

Shield volcanoes of the United States
Subduction volcanoes
Cascade Volcanoes
Volcanoes of Oregon
Mountains of Oregon
Cascade Range
Volcanoes of Deschutes County, Oregon
Mountains of Deschutes County, Oregon
Pleistocene shield volcanoes